The Northwest Upstate Illini Conference  is a high school conference in northwest and north central Illinois. The conference participates in athletics and activities in the Illinois High School Association. The conference comprises 20 small public high schools and one small private school, with enrollments between 60-340 students in Carroll, Jo Daviess, Lee, Ogle, Stephenson, Whiteside, and Winnebago counties.

History 
In 1996 the Northwestern Illinois Conference (NWIC) and Upstate Illini Conference (UIC) merged under the Upstate Illini banner.  Initially three divisions were formed for all team sports except football: West - Dakota, East Dubuque, Galena, Lena-Winslow, Orangeville, River Ridge, Stockton, and Warren  East - Ashton-Franklin Center, Durand, Kirkland-Hiawatha, North Boone, Pecatonica, Rockford Lutheran and South Beloit, and South - Forreston, Freeport Aquin, Fulton Unity Christian, Eastland, Pearl City, Milledgeville, Mt. Carroll and Polo. In 1999 Savanna was added to the South Division and Rockford Christian Life to the East Division for a total of 24 teams. In 2000, after six schools (Ashton-Franklin Center, Durand, Kirkland-Hiawatha, North Boone, Pecatonica and South Beloit) left to form the Four Rivers Conference, the two remaining schools from the East, Rockford Christian Life and Rockford Lutheran, also left the conference looking for competition within closer proximity.

Based on all of these changes, the remaining schools realigned under the new moniker '"Northwest Upstate Illini"' starting with the 2001 school year. The 18 remaining schools maintained divisional balance in all sports for 4 years, however, during the 2004-05 school year, the school districts of Savanna, Mt. Carroll and Thomson consolidated into the West Carroll School District, becoming the largest high school in the conference. This consolidation reduced the teams in the Northwest Division of football to 6 and also created a scheduling issue due to an odd number of teams within the conference. To correct this, prior to the 2005-06 school year, four schools, Ashton-Franklin Center, Durand, Pecatonica, and South Beloit, joined the conference. These four schools were previously members of the Four Rivers Conference and raised the number of schools from 17 to its highest total of 21. Fulton Unity left the conference to join the Northern Illinois Christian Conference after the 2007 school year, reducing the conference to a total of 20.

South Beloit left the NUIC after the 2015-16 season.  The Sobos joined the Northeastern Athletic Conference to compete against schools from Chicago, Rockford, Aurora, Arlington Heights, Elgin, Hebron, Crystal Lake, Ottawa, Mooseheart and Kirkland. To replace the exiting team, the NUIC added Amboy High School, formerly a member of the Three Rivers Conference. The Clippers began competition in the NUIC during the 2016-17 school year.

Between 2019 and 2020, seven teams within the conference announced that they would begin playing 8-man football. This change, as well as several schools cooping, reduced the number of 11-man football teams to nine. In order to maintain competitive balance, Fulton High School joined the NUIC for the 2021-22 school year from the Three Rivers Conference. A member of the Three Rivers Conference since the league's inception in 1975, Fulton made the move to the Northwest Upstate Illini Conference prior to the 2021-22 school year. The addition of Fulton brought the total number of schools back to 21.

NUIC Sportsmanship Creed 
Prior to every varsity sporting event, the following creed is read to everyone in attendance.

Current Membership 
The Northwest Upstate Illini Conference comprises 21 high schools, grades 9-12. There are 20 public and 1 private high school within the conference.

Sources:IHSA Conferences, IHSA Coop Teams, and IHSA Member Schools Directory

Previous members

Divisions and alignments

Basketball divisions 
In 2001, as the conference realigned under its new label, the divisions were broken into 2; nine team divisions.

Those groups were:
North - Dakota, East Dubuque, Galena, Lena-Winslow, Orangeville, River Ridge, Scales Mound, Stockton, and Warren
South - Aquin, Eastland, Forreston, Fulton Unity, Milledgeville, Pearl City, Polo, Savanna, Mt. Carroll

Starting in 2005, after the addition of the teams from the Four Rivers Conference and the unification of Savanna, Mt. Carroll and Thomson into West Carroll, the league broke into three divisions for basketball. Each division had 7 teams, however, for girls basketball, River Ridge and Scales Mound formed a coop that would keep the West with only 6 teams.

Those groups were:  
North - Aquin, Dakota, Durand, Orangeville, Pearl City, Pecatonica and South Beloit. 
South - Ashton-Franklin Center, Eastland, Forreston, Fulton Unity, Milledgeville, Polo, and West Carroll. 
West - East Dubuque, Galena, Lena-Winslow, River Ridge, Scales Mound, Stockton, and Warren.

This three division system lasted only for two years when Fulton Unity Christian joined the North Illinois Christian Conference for basketball prior to the start of in 2007-2008 school year. The league realigned back into two divisions with each having 10 teams. These divisions remained constant with the only change occurring in 2016 when Amboy was added to the East to replace South Beloit after their departure.

These groups were: 
East - Amboy, Aquin, Ashton-Franklin Center, Dakota, Durand, Forreston, Milledgeville, Orangeville, Pecatonica, and Polo.
West - East Dubuque, Eastland, Galena, Lena-Winslow, Pearl City, River Ridge, Scales Mound, Stockton, Warren and West Carroll.

Prior to the 2019-2020 school year, the conference realigned back to three divisions. The divisions would be labeled North, South and West and would be unbalanced with two divisions having 7 teams and one having 6. Fulton joined the conference for the 2021-22 season and were placed in the South Division, giving each division 7 teams.

These divisions are:
North - Aquin, Dakota, Durand, Lena-Winslow, Orangeville, Pearl City, and Pecatonica
South - Amboy, Ashton-Franklin Center, Eastland, Fulton, Forreston, Milledgeville, and Polo
West - East Dubuque, Galena, River Ridge, Scales Mound, Stockton, Warren, and West Carroll

Football alignment 
Initially in 2001, the Northwest Upstate Illini was divided into two football divisions, each having 7 total teams. 
These divisions were: 
Northwest - Dakota, Eastland-Pearl City (coop), Forreston, Galena, Lena-Winslow, Mt. Carroll and Savanna
Upstate -  Aquin, East Dubuque, Milledgeville, Orangeville, Polo, Warren-River Ridge (coop), and Stockton
 
In 2005, Mt. Carroll and Savanna consolidated with Thomson to become West Carroll.  During the same year, four teams from the Four Rivers Conference (Ashton-Franklin Center, Durand, Pecatonica, South Beloit) were accepted to join the conference. Durand, Pecatonica and South Beloit joined the Northwest Division and Ashton-Franklin Center entered the Upstate. In 2016, upon the departure of South Beloit, Amboy took their position in the Northwest division.

The final alignment of these divisions were:
Northwest - Amboy-LaMoille-Ohio (coop), Dakota, Durand-Pecatonica (coop), East Dubuque, Eastland-Pearl City (coop), Forreston, Galena, Lena-Winslow, West Carroll
Upstate -  Aquin, Ashton-Franklin Center, Milledgeville, Orangeville, Polo, River Ridge, Stockton, and Warren

Starting in 2019, Polo and River Ridge ceased playing traditional 11-man football and began playing 8-man. This change, along with Warren forming a coop with Black Hawk High School in South Wayne, Wisconsin, has created a conference realignment specifically for football. The conference split geographically into North and South divisions with seven schools on each side. Crossover games between schools in different divisions were scheduled based on enrollment.

These divisions were: 
North Division - Dakota, Durand-Pecatonica (coop), East Dubuque, Galena, Lena-Winslow, Orangeville, Stockton
South Division - AFC, Amboy-LaMoille-Ohio (coop), Aquin, Eastland-Pearl City (coop), Forreston, Milledgeville, and West Carroll

In 2021, five more teams from the conference transitioned to 8-man football. These teams include Ashton-Franklin Center, and Milledgeville as well as the 1984 (2A) state champion Amboy, the 1989 (1A) state championship team Orangeville, and Freeport Aquin, who claimed the (1A) state championship in 1981, 1986 and 2005. However, with the 2022 addition of Fulton High School, the conference has a net loss of only four teams. These changes will reduce the number of 11-man teams to 10 teams and eliminate the need for divisional play. The 2022 season included:

11-Man Football - Dakota, Durand-Pecatonica (coop), East Dubuque, Eastland-Pearl City (coop), Forreston, Fulton, Galena, Lena-Winslow, Stockton and West Carroll
8-Man Football - Amboy-LaMoille-Ohio (coop), Ashton-Franklin Center, Aquin, Milledgeville, Orangeville, Polo, and River Ridge

On November 18, 2021, the East Dubuque board of education voted 5 to 1 in favor of joining Southwestern High School (Wisconsin) for football, leaving the NUIC and bringing the total number of teams competing in 11-man football down to nine. This reduction causes each team in the conference the need to seek a non-conference game each season. The 2023 season included the following alignment:

11-Man Football - Dakota, Durand-Pecatonica (coop), Eastland-Pearl City (coop), Forreston, Fulton, Galena, Lena-Winslow, Stockton and West Carroll
8-Man Football - • North 1 Division: Ashton-Franklin Center •North 2 Division: Amboy-LaMoille-Ohio (coop), Aquin, Milledgeville, Orangeville, Polo, and River Ridge

Volleyball alignment 
In 2001, the conference utilized the same concept of North and South divisions for girls volleyball.

Those groups were:
North - Dakota, East Dubuque, Eastland, Galena, Lena-Winslow, Orangeville, River Ridge, Scales Mound, Stockton, and Warren
South - Aquin, Forreston, Fulton Unity, Milledgeville, Mt. Carroll, Pearl City, Polo and Savanna

Similar to basketball, when the league expanded in 2005, some teams shifted and the arrangements moved to the following 3 division system:

North - Aquin, Dakota, Durand, Orangeville, Pearl City, Pecatonica and South Beloit. 
South - Ashton-Franklin Center, Eastland, Forreston, Fulton Unity, Milledgeville, Polo, and West Carroll. 
West - East Dubuque, Galena, Lena-Winslow, River Ridge, Scales Mound, Stockton, and Warren.

In 2014, the conference eliminated divisions and created a single volleyball conference with all 20 teams and South Beloit was replaced with Amboy after they left the conference in 2016.

Prior to the 2019-2020 school year, the conference realigned back to three divisions. The divisions would once again be labeled North, South and West and would be unbalanced with two divisions having 7 teams and one having 6, however, this alignment changed for the 2021-22 season as Fulton joinied the South Division, giving each division 7 teams.

These divisions are:
North - Aquin, Dakota, Durand, Lena-Winslow, Orangeville, Pearl City, and Pecatonica
South - Amboy, Ashton-Franklin Center, Eastland, Forreston, Fulton, Milledgeville, and Polo
West - East Dubuque, Galena, River Ridge, Scales Mound, Stockton, and Warren, and West Carroll

Membership timeline

Cooperative Arrangements 

note: Highlighted school is the host

Amboy, and Ohio High Schools co-operate for boys baseball. (Co-Op ends 2023)
Amboy, and Ohio High Schools co-operate for girls softball. (Co-Op ends 2023)
Amboy, and Ohio High Schools co-operate for boys basketball. (Co-Op ends 2023)
Amboy, and Ohio High Schools co-operate for girls basketball. (Co-Op ends 2023)
Amboy, Ashton-Franklin Center, La Moille and Ohio High Schools co-operate for boys cross country. (Co-Op ends 2023)
Amboy, Ashton-Franklin Center, La Moille and Ohio High Schools co-operate for girls cross country. (Co-Op ends 2023)
Amboy, La Moille and Ohio High Schools co-operate for boys football. (Co-Op ends 2023)
Amboy, Ashton-Franklin Center, La Moille and Ohio High Schools co-operate for boys golf. (Co-Op ends 2023)
Amboy, Ashton-Franklin Center, La Moille and Ohio High Schools co-operate for girls golf. (Co-Op ends 2023)
Amboy, Ashton-Franklin Center, La Moille and Ohio High Schools co-operate for boys track & field. (Co-Op ends 2023)
Amboy, Ashton-Franklin Center, La Moille and Ohio High Schools co-operate for girls track & field. (Co-Op ends 2023)
Amboy, Ashton Franklin-Center, La Moille and Ohio High Schools co-operate for boys wrestling. (Co-Op ends 2023)
Amboy, Ashton Franklin-Center, La Moille and Ohio High Schools co-operate for girls wrestling. (Co-Op ends 2023)
Amboy, and Ohio High Schools co-operate for girls volleyball. (Co-Op ends 2023)
Ashton (A.-Franklin Center) and Byron co-operate for boys swimming & diving. (Co-Op ends 2023)
Ashton (A.-Franklin Center) and Byron co-operate for girls swimming & diving. (Co-Op ends 2023)
Durand and Pecatonica High Schools co-operate for boys cross country. (Co-Op ends 2023)
Durand and Pecatonica High Schools co-operate for girls cross country. (Co-Op ends 2023)
Durand and Pecatonica High Schools co-operate for boys wrestling. (Co-Op ends 2023)
Durand and Pecatonica High Schools co-operate for girls wrestling. (Co-Op ends 2023)
Eastland and Milledgville City High Schools co-operate for boys golf. (Co-Op ends 2023)
Eastland and Milledgville City High Schools co-operate for girls golf. (Co-Op ends 2023)
Eastland and Pearl City High Schools co-operate for football. (Co-Op ends 2023)
Forreston and Polo High Schools co-operate for boys track & field. (Co-Op ends 2023)
Forreston and Polo High Schools co-operate for girls track & field. (Co-Op ends 2023)
Forreston and Byron High Schools co-operate for boys swimming & diving. (Co-Op ends 2023)
Forreston and Byron High Schools co-operate for girls swimming & diving. (Co-Op ends 2023)
Fulton and Morrison High School co-operate for girls swimming and diving. (Co-Op ends 2023)
Hanover (River Ridge) and Scales Mound High Schools co-operate for boys baseball. (Co-Op ends 2023)
Hanover (River Ridge) and Scales Mound High Schools co-operate for boys golf. (Co-Op ends 2023)
Hanover (River Ridge) and Scales Mound High Schools co-operate for girls basketball.  (Co-Op ends 2023)
Lena-Winslow and Stockton High Schools co-operate for boys wrestling. (Co-Op ends 2023)
Lena-Winslow and Stockton High Schools co-operate for girls wrestling. (Co-Op ends 2023)
Lena-Winslow and Pearl City High Schools co-operate for girls track. (Co-Op ends 2023)
Lena-Winslow and Orangeville High Schools co-operate for speech individual events. (Co-Op ends 2023)
Milledgeville and Eastland High Schools co-operate for boys track & field. (Co-Op ends 2023)
Milledgeville and Eastland High Schools co-operate for girls track & field. (Co-Op ends 2023)
Pearl City and Lena-Winslow High Schools co-operate for boys golf. (Co-Op ends 2023)
Pearl City and Lena-Winslow High Schools co-operate for girls golf. (Co-Op ends 2023)
Pecatonica and Durand High Schools co-operate for boys baseball. (Co-Op ends 2023)
Pecatonica and Durand High Schools co-operate for football. (Co-Op ends 2023)
Pecatonica and Durand High Schools co-operate for boys golf. (Co-Op ends 2023)
Pecatonica and Durand High Schools co-operate for girls golf. (Co-Op ends 2021)
Pecatonica, Dakota and Durand High Schools co-operate for boys soccer. (Co-Op ends 2023)
Pecatonica and Byron High Schools co-operate for boys swimming & diving. (Co-Op ends 2023)
Pecatonica and Byron High Schools co-operate for girls swimming & diving. (Co-Op ends 2023)
Pecatonica and Durand High Schools co-operate for boys track & field. (Co-Op ends 2023)
Pecatonica and Durand High Schools co-operate for girls track & field. (Co-Op ends 2023)
Polo and Byron High Schools co-operate for boys swimming & diving. (Co-Op ends 2023)
Polo and Byron High Schools co-operate for girls swimming & diving. (Co-Op ends 2020)
Polo, Forreston, Eastland and Milledgeville High Schools co-operate for boys wrestling. (Co-Op ends 2023)
Polo, Forreston, Eastland and Milledgeville High Schools co-operate for girls wrestling. (Co-Op ends 2023)
Scales Mound and River Ridge High Schools co-operate for girls softball. (Co-Op ends 2023)
Scales Mound High School co-operates with Benton High School (WI) in Benton, Wisconsin, for football, therefore they do not participate in the IHSA football playoffs.
Stockton and Warren High Schools co-operate for speech individual events. (Co-Op ends 2023)
Stockton and Warren High Schools co-operate for boys track and field. (Co-Op ends 2023)
Stockton and Warren High Schools co-operate for girls track and field. (Co-Op ends 2023)
Stockton and Warren High Schools co-operate for girls softball. (Co-Op ends 2023)
Warren and Stockton High Schools co-operate for boys baseball. (Co-Op ends 2023)
Warren High School co-operates with Black Hawk High School (WI) in South Wayne, Wisconsin, for football, therefore they do not participate in the IHSA football playoffs.

Competitive Success 
Teams currently competing in the Northwest Upstate Illini Conference have won 84 team state championships in IHSA sponsored athletics and activities. This includes championships won prior to entering the league.
 The conference also has produced 135 individual championships, including golf, public speaking, track & field, and wrestling.  Josh Alber and Seth Milks from Dakota are the only individual 4-time state champions in the history of the conference.  As a wrestler, Alber finished his 4 years of competition undefeated with a final record of 182 wins and 0 losses. Alber also became the first four-time state champion in IHSA history to complete high school competition without a loss or tie.

State Champions 
Note: Championships listed here also include championships won by current member schools prior to any respective consolidations, as well as prior to the formation of the Northwest Upstate Illini Conference.

Team 

*Polo's championship in 8-man football is in a non-sanctioned IHSA activity.

Individual

Championship totals 

*Pearl City was the host school for the football coop with Eastland in the 2014 championship.
**Polo's championship in 8-man football is in a non-sanctioned IHSA activity.

References

External links
 Amboy High School
 Ashton-Franklin Center High School
 Aquin Catholic High School
 Dakota High School
 Durand High School
 East Dubuque High School
 Eastland High School
 Forreston High School
 Fulton High School
 Galena High School
 Lena-Winslow High School
 Milledgeville High School
 Orangeville High School
 Pearl City High School
 Pecatonica High School
 Polo High School
 River Ridge High School
 Scales Mound High School
 Stockton High School
 Warren High School
 West Carroll High School

High school sports conferences and leagues in the United States
Illinois high school sports conferences
High school sports in Illinois
2001 establishments in Illinois